This is a list of storytelling games – board games in which players construct or tell a story.

List
  Above and Below
  Agents of SMERSH
 Betrayal at House on the Hill
 Consequences
 Dead of Winter: A Crossroads Game
 Dixit
 Near and Far
 Mice and Mystics 
 Mythos tales
 Once Upon a Time
 Robinson Crusoe: Adventures on the Cursed Island
 Sherlock Holmes Consulting Detective
 Tales of the Arabian Nights
 This War of Mine
 T.I.M.E Stories
 The 7th Continent

See also
 List of role-playing games by genre

References

External links
 Storytelling games on BoardGameGeek

Board games
Role-playing games
Games
Lists of games